Seaside Retreat (foaled May 1, 2003 in Kentucky) is a Thoroughbred racehorse who competed in Canada and the United States from a base at Woodbine Racetrack in Toronto, Ontario. As a foal of 2003, he was a possible contender for the U.S. Triple Crown in 2006 and finished tenth in the Kentucky Derby.

Connections
Seaside Retreat is owned by William S. Farish III and trained by Mark Casse.  He's often ridden by Patrick Husbands. Bred by Centennial Farms, his sire is King Cugat, and his dam is She's Like Rio by Boundary.

In 2008, Seaside Retreat set a new Woodbine course record for a mile and a quarter on turf in winning the Nijinsky Stakes.

References
 Seaside Retreat's pedigree and photo

2003 racehorse births
Thoroughbred family 9-f
Racehorses bred in Kentucky
Racehorses trained in Canada